Mistrust the Angels is In Strict Confidence's fourth studio album. The album reached #87 on the German national charts.

Track listing

Singles
Herzattacke
When the Heart Starts to Bleed
Engelsstaub

References

External links 
 Album Page at the official website

2002 albums
In Strict Confidence albums